Valcabrère is a commune in the Haute-Garonne department in southwestern France.

Population

See also
Communes of the Haute-Garonne department

External links
  Photos of Saint-Just de Valcabrère

References

Communes of Haute-Garonne
World Heritage Sites in France